Rúben Filipe Oliveira Nunes (born 15 April 1992) is a Portuguese footballer who plays for C.D. Pinhalnovense as a defender.

Club career
On 26 October 2016, Nunes made his professional debut with Cova da Piedade in a 2016–17 Taça da Liga match against Arouca.

References

External links

1994 births
Footballers from Lisbon
Living people
Portuguese footballers
Association football defenders
C.D. Cova da Piedade players
C.D. Pinhalnovense players